St. Paul's Episcopal Church, Rock Creek Parish, is a historic Episcopal church located on Rock Creek Church Road, NW, in Washington, D.C., United States.

History
Founded in 1712 in then Prince George's County, Maryland, the congregation is the oldest religious institution within the boundaries of the present-day District of Columbia. The church was built in 1775, incorporating parts of an older church built in 1719. It was remodeled in 1853 and restored after a major fire in 1922. On March 16, 1972, St. Paul's was added to the National Register of Historic Places. The interior of the church received additional restoration in 2004, at which time a new pipe organ built by Dobson Pipe Organ Builders was installed. St. Paul's Church is well known for its excellent acoustics and outstanding professional choir. Sunday services are held at 8:00 a.m. and 10:30 a.m. each week with services of Choral Evensong held at 4:00 p.m. on scheduled Sundays.

See also

List of the oldest churches in the United States
National Register of Historic Places listings in Washington, D.C.
Rock Creek Cemetery

References

External links

St. Paul's Rock Creek Parish website
History of St. Paul's Rock Creek Parish

Churches completed in 1775
Churches on the National Register of Historic Places in Washington, D.C.
Episcopal churches in Washington, D.C.
Georgian Revival architecture in Washington, D.C.
Religious organizations established in 1712
18th-century Episcopal church buildings
Petworth (Washington, D.C.)